Carlos Leyes (born 12 August 1950) is an Argentine boxer. He competed in the men's light flyweight event at the 1972 Summer Olympics.

References

1950 births
Living people
Argentine male boxers
Olympic boxers of Argentina
Boxers at the 1972 Summer Olympics
Place of birth missing (living people)
Light-flyweight boxers